

The Dart Flittermouse is a British single-seat ultralight designed by A R Weyl and built by Dart Aircraft Limited at Dunstable, England.

Design and development
The Flittermouse was a high-wing braced pusher monoplane powered by a 25 hp Scott Squirrel piston engine with a pusher propeller. An open frame carried the tail unit. One aircraft was built and registered G-AELZ

In 1938 the rear skid was removed and the main landing gear moved back and a castoring nose wheel was fitted. After a number of private owners it was scrapped at Blackbushe Airport in 1951.

Specifications

References

Notes

Bibliography

1930s British sport aircraft
Flittermouse
Single-engined pusher aircraft
High-wing aircraft
Aircraft first flown in 1936